Joey Simon Villaseñor (born October 17, 1975) is an American former professional mixed martial artist. A professional competitor from 1999 until 2012, Villasenor competed for the PRIDE Fighting Championships, Strikeforce, EliteXC, King of the Cage, DEEP, Shark Fights, BAMMA, and the World Fighting Alliance. Villasenor is the former King of the Cage Middleweight Champion, and defended this title seven times before vacating it to sign with PRIDE.

Background
Villasenor was born in East Los Angeles and lived there for the first nine years of his life before moving to New Mexico in 1984. He graduated from Farmington High School but also attended West Mesa High School in Albuquerque, New Mexico. Villasenor was athletic and in high school he played baseball, football, and participated in track and field. Villasenor first began watching UFC events when he was 17 or 18 years old, but thought that the fighting was brutal, although he wanted to learn self-defense. He began competing in martial arts when he was 19 years old, training in Brazilian jiu-jitsu and boxing. He was a four-time Amateur Regional Boxing Champion with a 16-0 record, and 15 wins by KO.

Mixed martial arts career

Early career
Villaseñor made his professional debut in April 1999 and after 15 consecutive wins, he was signed by the PRIDE Fighting Championships.

PRIDE
Villasenor made his PRIDE debut on June 4, 2006 against Japanese veteran, Ryo Chonan. Despite losing a decision, Villaseñor was brought back by the organization to fight UFC veteran Robbie Lawler at PRIDE 32. He lost via knockout only 22 seconds into the first round due to a flying knee.

EliteXC
Villasenor then signed with EliteXC.  He defeated former UFC veteran David Loiseau in EliteXC's inaugural event, and lost to Murilo Rua at the EliteXC co-promotion Strikeforce Shamrock vs. Baroni, and rebounded with a win over Riki Fukuda at EliteXC: Uprising. Villasenor scored an impressive knockout over Ryan Jensen at Strikeforce: Shamrock vs. Le. On May, 31st, at EliteXC's Saturday Night Fights, Villaseñor won his bout against Phil Baroni. This bout can potentially be the elimination match for the EliteXC Middleweight Championship. It was recently announced that Villaseñor would receive a title shot in a rematch against Robbie Lawler on the scheduled November 8, 2008 EliteXC show. However ProElite canceled the show shortly after due to large amounts of debt.

Strikeforce
After the demise of EliteXC, Villasenor was signed by Strikeforce and defeated Evangelista Santos at Strikeforce Challengers: Villasenor vs. Cyborg via split decision.

Villaseñor faced Ronaldo Souza on May 15, 2010 at Strikeforce: Heavy Artillery.  He lost the fight via decision.

On December 9, 2010, Villaseñor was released from Strikeforce, along with Joe Riggs.

Shark Fights
Villaseñor was expected to face Drew McFedries on September 11, 2010 at Shark Fights 13 but McFedries was forced off the card with an injury. He instead faced Danillo Villefort and lost the fight via unanimous decision.

Villaseñor next faced Chris Camozzi at Shark Fights 15. The fight was initially ruled a draw, but was subsequently overturned and counted as a win for Camozzi by the New Mexico Athletic Commission when it was revealed one of the judges scores was added incorrectly.

BAMMA
Villaseñor made his BAMMA debut against fighter Jim Wallhead at BAMMA 8. He lost the fight via KO in the first round.

Championships and Accomplishments
King of the Cage
KOTC Middleweight Championship (One time)

Mixed martial arts record

|-
| Win
| align=center|29–10
| Donnie Liles
| Decision (unanimous)
| Jackson's MMA Series 8
| 
| align=center|3
| align=center|5:00
| Albuquerque, New Mexico, United States
| 
|-
| Loss
| align=center|28–10
| Jim Wallhead
| KO (punches)
| BAMMA 8: Manuwa vs. Rea
| 
| align=center|1
| align=center|0:48
| Nottingham, England
| 
|-
| Win
| align=center| 28–9
| Chuck Parmelee
| TKO (punches)
| Jackson's MMA Series 6
| 
| align=center|1
| align=center|2:47
| Albuquerque, New Mexico, United States
| 
|-
| Loss
| align=center| 27–9
| Chris Camozzi
| Decision (split)
| Shark Fights 15: Villaseñor vs Camozzi
| 
| align=center|3
| align=center|5:00
| Rio Rancho, New Mexico, United States
| 
|-
| Loss
| align=center| 27–8
| Danillo Villefort
| Decision (unanimous)
| Shark Fights 13: Jardine vs Prangley
| 
| align=center| 3
| align=center| 5:00
| Amarillo, Texas, United States
| 
|-
| Loss
| align=center| 27–7
| Ronaldo Souza
| Decision (unanimous)
| Strikeforce: Heavy Artillery
| 
| align=center| 3
| align=center| 5:00
| St. Louis, Missouri, United States
| 
|-
| Win
| align=center| 27–6
| Evangelista Santos
| Decision (split)
| Strikeforce Challengers: Villasenor vs. Cyborg
| 
| align=center| 3
| align=center| 5:00
| Kent, Washington, United States
| 
|-
| Win
| align=center| 26–6
| Phil Baroni
| TKO (punches)
| EliteXC: Primetime
| 
| align=center| 1
| align=center| 1:11
| Newark, New Jersey, United States
| 
|-
| Win
| align=center| 25–6
| Ryan Jensen
| KO (punch)
| Strikeforce: Shamrock vs. Le
| 
| align=center| 1
| align=center| 4:45
| San Jose, California, United States
| 
|-
| Win
| align=center| 24–6
| Riki Fukuda
| Decision (split)
| EliteXC: Uprising
| 
| align=center| 3
| align=center| 5:00
| Honolulu, Hawaii, United States
| 
|-
| Loss
| align=center| 23–6
| Murilo Rua
| TKO (punches)
| Strikeforce: Shamrock vs. Baroni
| 
| align=center| 2
| align=center| 1:05
| San Jose, California, United States
| 
|-
| Win
| align=center| 23–5
| David Loiseau
| Decision (unanimous)
| EliteXC: Destiny
| 
| align=center| 3
| align=center| 5:00
| Southaven, Mississippi, United States
| 
|-
| Loss
| align=center| 22–5
| Robbie Lawler
| KO (flying knee)
| PRIDE 32
| 
| align=center| 1
| align=center| 0:22
| Las Vegas, Nevada, United States
| 
|-
| Win
| align=center| 22–4
| John Cronk
| TKO 
| KOTC: Civil War
| 
| align=center| 1
| align=center| 4:04
| Towaoc, Colorado, United States
| 
|-
| Loss
| align=center| 21–4
| Ryo Chonan
| Decision (split)
| PRIDE: Bushido 11
| 
| align=center| 2
| align=center| 5:00
| Saitama, Saitama, Japan
| PRIDE 2006 Welterweight Grand Prix Opening Round
|-
| Win
| align=center| 21–3
| Yuya Shirai
| Decision (unanimous)
| DEEP: 24 Impact
| 
| align=center| 2
| align=center| 5:00
| Tokyo, Japan
| 
|-
| Win
| align=center| 20–3
| Kyacey Uscola
| TKO (doctor stoppage)
| KOTC: Anarchy
| 
| align=center| 2
| align=center| 4:14
| Prince George, British Columbia, Canada
| 
|-
| Win
| align=center| 19–3
| Jorge Santiago
| Decision (unanimous)
| KOTC 58: Prime Time
| 
| align=center| 3
| align=center| 5:00
| San Jacinto, California, United States
| 
|-
| Win
| align=center| 18–3
| Damien Riccio
| KO (punches)
| KOTC: Warzone
| 
| align=center| 1
| align=center| 1:55
| Sheffield, England
| 
|-
| Win
| align=center| 17–3
| Michael Gonzalez
| Submission (choke)
| KOTC 55: Grudge Match
| 
| align=center| 1
| align=center| 1:05
| Albuquerque, New Mexico, United States
| 
|-
| Win
| align=center| 16–3
| Brendan Seguin
| TKO (stoppage)
| KOTC 48: Payback
| 
| align=center| 1
| align=center| 2:10
| Cleveland, Ohio, United States
| 
|-
| Win
| align=center| 15–3
| Jorge Ortiz
| TKO (submission to strikes)
| KOTC: Hostile Takeover
| 
| align=center| 1
| align=center| 3:19
| Acoma, New Mexico, United States
| 
|-
| Win
| align=center| 14–3
| Brian Foster
| Submission (rear-naked choke)
| KOTC 41: Relentless
| 
| align=center| 1
| align=center| 4:25
| San Jacinto, California, United States
| 
|-
| Win
| align=center| 13–3
| Hank Weis
| KO (punch)
| KOTC: New Mexico
| 
| align=center| 1
| align=center| 0:05
| Albuquerque, New Mexico, United States
| 
|-
| Win
| align=center| 12–3
| Danny Higgins
| TKO (submission to elbows)
| XFC 4: Australia vs. The World
| 
| align=center| 1
| align=center| 2:42
| Queensland, Australia
| 
|-
| Win
| align=center| 11–3
| Art Santore
| TKO (cut)
| KOTC 30: The Pinnacle
| 
| align=center| 2
| align=center| 0:31
| Los Angeles, California, United States
| 
|-
| Win
| align=center| 10–3
| James Fanshier
| Submission (rear-naked choke)
| KOTC 28: More Punishment
| 
| align=center| 2
| align=center| 2:26
| Reno, Nevada, United States
| 
|-
| Win
| align=center| 9–3
| Joe Merit
| TKO 
| KOTC 24: Mayhem
| 
| align=center| 1
| align=center| 4:06
| Albuquerque, New Mexico, United States
| 
|-
| Win
| align=center| 8–3
| Tony Galindo
| TKO (corner stoppage)
| KOTC 21: Invasion
| 
| align=center| 1
| align=center| 5:00
| Albuquerque, New Mexico, United States
| 
|-
| Win
| align=center| 7–3
| Lorn Estes
| TKO (submission to punches)
| KOTC 20: Crossroads
| 
| align=center| 1
| align=center| 1:43
| Bernalillo, New Mexico, United States
| 
|-
| Loss
| align=center| 6–3
| Jermaine Andre
| TKO (foot injury)
| WFA 2: Level 2
| 
| align=center| 1
| align=center| 0:21
| Las Vegas, Nevada, United States
| 
|-
| Win
| align=center| 6–2
| Todd Carney
| Submission (choke)
| KOTC 14: 5150
| 
| align=center| 1
| align=center| 1:47
| Bernalillo, New Mexico, United States
| 
|-
| Win
| align=center| 5–2
| Tim Credeur
| TKO (submission to punches)
| KOTC 13: Revolution
| 
| align=center| 2
| align=center| 3:24
| Reno, Nevada, United States
| 
|-
| Win
| align=center| 4–2
| Eddy Rolon
| TKO (cut)
| Warriors Challenge 12
| 
| align=center| 1
| align=center| 7:30
| Friant, California, United States
| 
|-
| Win
| align=center| 3–2
| Allan Mollring
| TKO (punches)
| Warriors Challenge 11
| 
| align=center| 1
| align=center| 3:27
| Fresno, California, United States
| 
|-
| Loss
| align=center| 2–2
| David Terrell
| Submission (armbar)
| Warriors Challenge 9
| 
| align=center| 1
| align=center| 2:24
| Friant, California, United States
| 
|-
| Win
| align=center| 2–1
| Gabriel Duran
| Submission (choke)
| Warriors Challenge 6
| 
| align=center| 1
| align=center| 2:31
| Friant, California, United States
| 
|-
| Loss
| align=center| 1–1
| Adam Ryan
| KO (punch)
| WVF: Casper
| 
| align=center| 2
| align=center| 5:00
| Casper, Wyoming, United States
| 
|-
| Win
| align=center| 1–0
| Shane Schartzer
| TKO (submission to punches)
| WVF: Durango
| 
| align=center| 1
| align=center| 1:12
| Durango, Colorado, United States
|

See also
List of male mixed martial artists

References

External links

1975 births
Living people
American male mixed martial artists
Mixed martial artists utilizing boxing
Mixed martial artists utilizing Brazilian jiu-jitsu
American mixed martial artists of Mexican descent
American male boxers
American practitioners of Brazilian jiu-jitsu
Sportspeople from Albuquerque, New Mexico